Al-Dirbasiyah is a Syrian town on the Syria–Turkey border opposite the Turkish town of Şenyurt. Administratively it is part of the Al-Hasakah Governorate. According to the Syria Central Bureau of Statistics (CBS), al-Dirbasiyah had a population of 8,551 in the 2004 census. It is the administrative center of a nahiyah ("subdistrict") consisting of 113 localities with a combined population of 55,614 in 2004. The majority of the inhabitants of the town are Kurds and Arabs and a smaller Assyrian minority.

It is connected by road to Tell Beydar in the south.

Civil war

On 22 July 2012, during the civil war, Kurdish-led YPG forces took control over the town, after Syrian government forces, following an ultimatum issued by the YPG, withdrew from it. The town was thus brought into the AANES. The Syrian Army entered the town in October 2019, as part of the Second Northern Syria Buffer Zone Agreement.

On 16 July 2020, an unknown UAV suspected to be Turkish carried out a strike against a Russian coordination point south of al-Dirbasiyah. Two Russian soldiers, one SAA member and two members of the Asayish were injured in the strike.

Churches in the town
 Syriac Orthodox Church of Saint Assia al-Hakim (كنيسة القديس مار آسيا الحكيم للسريان الأرثوذكس)

References 

Populated places in Ras al-Ayn District
Towns in Syria
Syria–Turkey border crossings
Kurdish communities in Syria